The 1604 Arica earthquake is an earthquake that occurred at 1:30 pm on November 24, 1604, offshore Arica, Chile (formerly part of the Spanish Empire). The estimated magnitude range is 8.0–8.5  and possibly up to 9.0 . It had a destructive tsunami that destroyed Arica and caused major damage at Arequipa. 1,200 km of coastline were affected by the tsunami. The recorded effects of this earthquake are very similar to those for the 1868 Arica event, suggesting a similar magnitude and rupture area of the megathrust between the subducting Nazca Plate and the overriding South American Plate. Tsunami deposits have been identified on the Chatham Islands that are likely to have been caused by a trans-Pacific tsunami caused by the 1604 earthquake.

Tectonic setting
Off the coasts of Peru and Chile, the Nazca plate subducts underneath the South American plate along the Peru-Chile Trench. At the location of the earthquake, the convergence rate between the two plates is /year. Large events at the plate boundary are relatively common, with similar large earthquakes occurring in 1687, 1784, 1868, and 2001. This earthquake cycle is considered to be bimodal, which means that the recurring earthquake is either a relatively small (but still large earthquake) or a truly large earthquake. Only the 1604 and 1868 events are considered to have been the latter truly colossal events.

Earthquake
Little is known about the earthquake, but it is interpreted to be similar in size and faulting to the 1868 Arica earthquake. The cities of Arequipa, Tacna, Moquegua experienced shaking of Modified Mercalli Instensity VIII, while Cuzco and Ica experienced VI shaking. It is believed that the 1604 event was unable to rupture north of the Nazca Ridge, which means that only the absolute largest earthquakes (such as 1868) can pass through this semi-persistent rupture barrier.

Tsunami
The tsunami was widespread and impacted many countries. The tsunami, along with the 1868 event, is considered one of "the greatest historical tsunami events along the Perú-Chile Trench". In Oceania, the Chatham Islands have recorded what is very likely evidence of tsunami from this event as well.

Damage
Arica was destroyed and rebuilt after the earthquake, while Arequipa was so severely damaged that only the San Francisco monastery remained standing. In Pisco, only certain parts of the town experienced major damage. Damage was reported across the Pacific ocean. Overall, damages from the earthquake were comparable to the 1868 earthquake.

See also
 1868 Arica earthquake
 List of earthquakes in Peru

References 

Sources

 
 
 
 
 
 
 

Earthquakes in Chile
Earthquakes in Peru
1600s earthquakes
1604
History of Arica y Parinacota Region